Bourzey castle is called also Mirza castle,. It is located at the border of Syria coastal mountains and Ghab valley, 25 km away from Jisr al-Shughur, at altitude 450 m. The inscriptions and mentioning of the castle relate it to the Byzantine era in 11th century. Architecturally it has triangle shape, the western façade is 175 m, the eastern is 50 m. The southern and eastern façades are adjacent to deep gorges, but the western façade is the least steep. There is 21 towers and a small church on the surface.

After Byzantine rule the castle passed to Ayyubids, who built additional towers in Arabic style. Mamelouks came later to fortify the southern towers.

The castle has several arrow bastions, underground rooms, water reservoirs. The road to the castle ends at the western slope. One needs climbing the mountain (~100 m) to reach the castle.

Sources 
Official site of Hama governorate - Syria

External links 
Pictures

Castles in Syria
Byzantine forts
Byzantine sites in Asia
11th-century fortifications